The 17th constituency of Paris is a French legislative constituency in the Paris département (75). Like the other 576 French constituencies, it elects one MP using the two-round system.
The constituency, following the 2010 redistricting of French legislative constituencies, consists of part of the 18th arrondissement, comprising the districts of Goutte-d'Or and La Chapelle, and part of the 19th arrondissement, comprising the district of La Villette and a small part of the district of Combat located at west of avenue Secrétan, avenue Simon-Bolivar and rue Henri-Turot,
which is almost exactly the area covered by the 1988-2007 19th constituency.

The 1988-2007 version of the constituency covered areas moved to the post 2010 3rd constituency.

Historic representation

Election results

2022

 
 
 
 
 
 
|-
| colspan="8" bgcolor="#E9E9E9"|
|-

2017

 
 
 
 
 
 
 
 
|-
| colspan="8" bgcolor="#E9E9E9"|
|-

2012

 
 
 
 
 
|-
| colspan="8" bgcolor="#E9E9E9"|
|-

2007
Elections between 1988 and 2007 were based on the 1988 boundaries.  The 17th constituency covered areas moved to the post 2010 3rd constituency.

 
 
 
 
 
 
 
|-
| colspan="8" bgcolor="#E9E9E9"|
|-

2002

 
 
 
 
 
 
 
|-
| colspan="8" bgcolor="#E9E9E9"|
|-

1997

 
 
 
 
 
 
 
|-
| colspan="8" bgcolor="#E9E9E9"|
|-

References

Government of Paris
17